George White-Thomas (1750 – 24 June 1821) was a British politician and the Member of Parliament for Chichester from 1784 to 1812.

See also
 List of MPs in the first United Kingdom Parliament

References

1750 births
1821 deaths
British MPs 1784–1790
British MPs 1790–1796
British MPs 1796–1800
UK MPs 1801–1802
UK MPs 1802–1806
UK MPs 1806–1807
UK MPs 1807–1812
Members of the Parliament of Great Britain for English constituencies
Members of the Parliament of the United Kingdom for English constituencies